Alexander Pringle may refer to:
 Alexander Pringle (politician)
 Alexander Pringle (rugby union)